"When a Woman Cries" is a song written by Buck Moore and Mentor Williams, and recorded by American country music artist Janie Fricke.  It was released in November 1986 as the second single from the album Black & White.  The song reached #20 on the Billboard Hot Country Singles & Tracks chart.

Chart performance

References

1987 singles
1986 songs
Janie Fricke songs
Songs written by Mentor Williams
Song recordings produced by Norro Wilson
Columbia Records singles
Songs written by Buck Moore